Sinovuyo Ntuntwana (born 2 February 1993) is a South African cricketer. He made his first-class debut for Border in the 2015–16 Sunfoil 3-Day Cup on 15 October 2015.

References

External links
 

1993 births
Living people
South African cricketers
Border cricketers